Middle East Commando was a battalion sized British Commando unit of the British Army during the Second World War. The Commando was formed in the Middle East from the survivors of the Layforce Commando unit partly to placate Winston Churchill who championed the commando idea. In December 1940 a Middle East Commando depot was formed with the responsibility of training and supplying reinforcements for the Commando units in the Middle East. The Middle East Commando was disbanded in 1942.

References
Notes

Bibliography

Commando units and formations of the United Kingdom
Military units and formations established in 1940
Military units and formations disestablished in 1941